Gypsum concrete is a building material used as a floor underlayment used in wood-frame and concrete construction for fire ratings, sound reduction, radiant heating, and floor leveling. It is a mixture of gypsum plaster, Portland cement, and sand. The brand name Gyp-Crete, a Maxxon Corporation trademark, has come into general use as a term for gypsum concrete by construction professionals and architects.

Composition 
US patent 4,444,925 lists the components of Gyp-Crete® as atmospheric calcined gypsum, sand, water, and small amounts of various additives. Additives listed include polyvinyl alcohol, an extender such as sodium citrate or fly ash, a surfactant such as Colloid defoamer 1513 DD made by Colloids, Inc., and a fluidizer based on sodium or potassium derivatives of naphthalene sulfonate formaldehyde condensate. One example mix is shown below.

The purpose of the polyvinyl alcohol is to prevent the surface of the concrete from becoming dusty. While the exact mechanism is not known, it is thought that as the concrete sets, water migrates to the surface, bringing with it fine, dusty particles. When the water evaporates, the dusty particles are deposited on the surface. It is thought that the polyvinyl alcohol prevents the dusty particles from migrating upwards with the water.

The mix is prepared on site using a specialized truck. The truck contains a tank for water, a mixing tank, a holding tank, a pump, and a conveyor for the sand and calcined gypsum. A hopper for the sand and gypsum is mounted externally on the vehicle.

To prepare the mix, the sand and calcined gypsum are added to the hopper and mixed. Most of the required water is added to the mixing tank, then the sand and calcined gypsum are mixed in. Once all the sand and calcined gypsum have been mixed in, the rest of the water is added until the proper consistency is attained. Finally, the additives are mixed in and the whole batch of concrete is moved to the holding tank to be pumped out into the required area via long hoses. A small sample is taken from the batch and set aside so that the set-up time can be observed and adjustments can be made to the amount of additives so that the timing is correct.

Once the mix has been poured, little leveling, if any, is needed. The mix should be smoothed gently with a flat board, such as a 40” 1x4. This helps to concentrate the calcined gypsum at the surface.

Previous formulations 
US patent 4,075,374 lists the by-weight formulation as 10 parts pressure calcined gypsum, 38-48 parts sand, and 4-10 parts water. 0.03 to 0.1 parts of a latex emulsion, such as Dow Latex 460, were also added. To prevent foaming, a defoamer such as WEX was added to the latex at a concentration of 0.2%. It was stated that gypsum calcined at atmospheric pressure produced poor results due to it having flaky particles, and that gypsum calcined under a pressure of 15-17 psi produced better results because it had denser, crystalline particles.

Later it was found that this original formulation expanded too much and in some instances floors cracked. US patent 4,159,912 describes changes made so that the expansion was greatly reduced. In that formulation, 5-8% of Portland cement was added to reduce the expansion. The latex emulsion and antifoaming agent were no longer necessary as the concrete was strengthened by the Portland cement. It was found that atmospheric calcined gypsum could be used for the majority of the calcined gypsum if it was ball milled to change the texture. The proportion of sand was also changed, so that it was in a 1:1.3 to 1:3 ratio with the calcined gypsum. This resulted in a runnier mix, but the set up time was not changed.

Advantages and disadvantages 
Gypsum concrete is lightweight and fire-resistant. A 1.5-inch slab of gypsum concrete weighs 13 pounds per square foot versus 18 pounds per square foot for regular concrete. 
Even though gypsum concrete weighs less, it still has the same compressive strength as regular concrete, based on its application as underlayment or top coat flooring. 
A 7-man work crew can lay 4–6 times as much gypsum concrete in a work day as regular poured Portland cement. This is due to the ease of leveling the very runny gypsum concrete versus normal concrete.  In addition, if the wooden subfloor is first coated in a film of latex, the adhesion between the subfloor and the concrete is much better than the adhesion obtained with “normal” concrete. A further benefit is that nails can be driven through the cement into the subfloor without it chipping.
The cost of gypsum concrete is comparable to regular concrete, ranging from $1.75 per square foot to $6.00 per square foot. 
Regular concrete ranges from $2.50 to $4.50 per square foot.

History 
In the late 1940s, copper tubing and Portland concrete were used to install radiant heat flooring.  The copper tubes would be laid out around the ground and then the Portland concrete could be poured to cover the tubing and make an even base for the floor.  However, this practice fell out of use in the United States within 15–20 years because the Portland concrete was too corrosive on the copper tubing.  In the 1980s Gypsum concrete again became widely used in the United States for radiant heat flooring as plastic PEX tubing could be used with Gypsum concrete for radiant heat flooring without concern for corrosion on the PEX tubing.

Notes 
1.  The table in the patent lists the PVA content as 0.45 grains (0.00002%). Later on, it is stated that the PVA should be in a 1:0.005625 ratio with the calcined gypsum. This yields a PVA content of 0.45 lbs (0.16%).

References

Concrete
Soil-based building materials